Lck (or lymphocyte-specific protein tyrosine kinase) is a 56 kDa protein that is found inside specialized cells of the immune system called lymphocytes. The Lck is a member of Src kinase family (SFK), it is important for the activation of the T-cell receptor signaling in both naive T cells and effector T cells. The role of the Lck is less prominent in the activation or in the maintenance of memory CD8 T cells in comparison to CD4 T cells. In addition,  the role of the lck varies among the memory T cells subsets. It seems that in mice, in the effector memory T cells (TEM)  population, more than 50% of lck is present in a constitutively active conformation, whereas, only less than 20% of lck is present as active form of lck. These differences are due to differential regulation by SH2 domain–containing phosphatase-1 (Shp-1) and C-terminal Src kinase.

The Lck is responsible for the initiation of the TCR signaling cascade inside the cell by phosphorylating immunoreceptor tyrosine‑based activation motifs (ITAM) within the TCR-associated chains.

The Lck can be found in different forms in the immune cells: free in the cytosol or bound to the plasma membrane (PM) through myristoylation and palmitoylation. Due to the presence of the conserved CxxC motif (C20 and C23) in the zinc clasp structure, the Lck is able to bind the cell surface coreceptors CD8 and\or CD4.

Bound and free Lck have different properties: free Lck have more pronounced kinase activity in comparison to bounded Lck, moreover, the free form produces a higher T cell activation. The reasons of these differences are not well understood yet.

T cell signaling 

Lck is most commonly found in T cells. It associates with the cytoplasmic tails of the CD4 and CD8 co-receptors on T helper cells and cytotoxic T cells, respectively, to assist signaling from the T cell receptor (TCR) complex. T cells are able to respond to pathogen and cancer using T-cell receptor, nevertheless, they can also react to self-antigen causing the onset of autoimmune diseases. The T cells maturation occurs in the thymus and it is regulated by a threshold that defines the limit between the positive and the negative selection of thymocytes. in order to avoid the onset of autoimmune diseases, highly self-reactive T cells are removed during the negative selection, whereas, an amount of weak self-reactive T cells is required to promote an efficient immune response, therefore during the positive selection these cells are chosen for maturation. The threshold for positive and negative selection of developing T cells is regulated by the bound between the Lck and co-receptors.

There are two main pools of T cells which mediate adaptive immune responses: CD4+ T cells (or helper T cells), and CD8+ T-cells (or cytotoxic T cells) which are MHCII-and MHCI restricted respectively. Despite their role in the immune system is different their activation is similar. Cytotoxic T cells are directly involved in the individuation and in the removal of infected cells, whereas helper T cells modulate other immune cells to supply the response.

The initiation of immune response takes place when T cells encounter and recognize their cognate antigen. The antigen-presenting cells (APC) expose on their surface a fraction of the antigen that is recognized either from CD8+T cells or CD4+Tcells. This binding leads to the activation of TCR signaling cascade in which the immunoreceptor tyrosine-based activation motifs (ITAM) located in the CD3-zeta chains (ζ-chains) of the TCR complex, are phosphorylated by Lck and less extended by Fyn. Both coreceptor-bound and free Lck can phosphorylate the CD3 chains upon TCR activation, evidences suggest that the free form of Lck can be recruited and trigger the TCR signal faster than the coreceptor-bound Lck  Additionally, upon T cell activation, a fraction of kinase active Lck, translocate from outside of lipid rafts (LR) to inside lipid rafts where it interacts with and activates LR-resident Fyn, which is involved in further downstream signaling activation. Once ITAM complex is phosphorylated the CD3 chains can be bound by another cytoplasmic tyrosine kinase called ZAP-70. In the case of CD8+ T cells, once ZAP70 binds CD3, the coreceptor associated with Lck binds the MHC stabilizing the TCR-MHC-peptide interaction. The phosphorylated form of ZAP-70 recruits another molecule in the signaling cascade called LAT (Linker for activation of T cells), a transmembrane protein. LAT acts as a scaffold able to regulate the TCR proximal signals in a phosphorylation-dependent manner. The most important proteins recruited by phosphorylated LAT are Shc-Grb2-SOS, PI3K, and phospholipase C (PLC). The residue responsible for the recruitment of phospholipase C-γ1 (PLC-γ1) is Y132. This binding leads to the Tec family kinase ITK-mediated PLC-γ1 phosphorylation and activation that consequentially produce calcium (Ca2+) ions mobilization. and activation of important signaling cascades within the lymphocyte. These include the Ras-MEK-ERK pathway, which goes on to activate certain transcription factors such as NFAT, NF-κB, and AP-1.  These transcription factors regulate the production of a plethora of gene products, most notable, cytokines such as Interleukin-2 that promote long-term proliferation and differentiation of the activated lymphocytes. In addition to the significance of Lck and Fyn in T cell receptor signaling, these two src kinases have also been shown to be important in TLR-mediated signaling in T cells.

The function of Lck has been studied using several biochemical methods, including gene knockout (knock-out mice), Jurkat cells deficient in Lck (JCaM1.6), and siRNA-mediated RNA interference.

Lck activity regulation 
The activity of the Lck can be positively or negatively regulated by the presence of other proteins such as the membrane protein CD146, the transmembrane tyrosine phosphatase CD45 and C-terminal Src kinase (Csk). In mice, CD146 directly interacts with the SH3 domain of coreceptor-free LCK via its cytoplasmic domain, promoting the LCK autophosphorylation. There is very little understanding of the role of CD45 isoforms, it is known that they are cell type-specific, and that they depend on the state of activation and differentiation of cells. In naïve T cells in humans, CD45RA isoform is more frequent, whereas when cells are activated the CD45R0 isoform is expressed in higher concentrations. Mice express low levels of high molecular weight isoforms (CD45RABC) in thymocytes or peripheral T cells. Low levels of CD45RB are typical in primed cells, while high levels of CD45RB are found in both naïve and primed cells. In general, CD45 acts to promote the active form of LCK by dephosphorylating a tyrosine (Y192) in its inhibitory C-terminal tail. The consequent trans-autophosphorylation of the tyrosine in the lck activation loop (Y394), stabilizes its active form promoting its open conformation which further enhances the kinase activity and substrate binding. The Dephosphorylation of the Y394 site can also be regulated by SH2 domain-containing phosphatase 1 (SHP-1), PEST-domain enriched tyrosine phosphatase (PEP), and protein tyrosine phosphatase-PEST. In contrast, Csk has an opposite role to that of CD45, it phosphorylated the Y505 of Lck promoting the closed conformation with inhibited kinase activity. When both Y394 and Y505 are unphosphorylated the lck show a basal kinase activity, vice versa, when phosphorylated, lck show similar activity to the Y394 single phosphorylated Lck

Structure 

Lck is a 56-kilodalton protein. The N-terminal tail of Lck is myristoylated and palmitoylated, which tethers the protein to the plasma membrane of the cell. The protein furthermore contains a SH3 domain, a SH2 domain and in the C-terminal part the tyrosine kinase domain. The two main phosphorylation sites on Lck are tyrosines 394 and 505. The former is an autophosphorylation site and is linked to activation of the protein. The latter is phosphorylated by Csk, which inhibits Lck because the protein folds up and binds its own SH2 domain. Lck thus serves as an instructive example that protein phosphorylation may result in both activation and inhibition.

Lck and disease 
Mutations in Lck are liked to a various range of diseases such as SCID (Severe combined immunodeficiency) or CIDs. In these pathologies, the dysfunctional activation of the lck leads to T cell activation failure. Many pathologies are linked to the overexpression of Lck  such as cancer, asthma, diabetes 1, rheumatoid arthritis, psoriasis, systemic lupus erythematosus, inflammatory bowel diseases (crohn’s disease and ulcerative colitis), organ graft rejection, atherosclerosis, hypersensitivity reactions, polyarthritis, dermatomyositis. The increase of the lck in colonic epithelial cells can lead to colorectal cancer. The lck play a role also in the Thymoma, an auto-immune disorder which involve thymus. Tumorigenesis is enhanced by abnormal proliferation of immature thymocytes due to low levels of Lck.

Lymphoid protein tyrosine phosphatase (lyp), is one of the suppressor of  lck activity and mutations in this  protein are correlated with the onset of diabetes 1. Increased activity of lck promote the onset of the diabetes 1.

Regarding respiratory diseases, asthma is associated with the activation of th2 type of t cell whose differentiation is mediated by lck. Moreover, mice with an unbalanced amount of lck show altered lung function which can consequentially leads to the onset of asthma.

Substrates 

Lck tyrosine phosphorylates a number of proteins, the most important of which are the CD3 receptor, CEACAM1, ZAP-70, SLP-76, the IL-2 receptor, Protein kinase C, ITK, PLC, SHC, RasGAP, Cbl, Vav1, and PI3K.

Inhibition 

In resting T cells, Lck is constitutively inhibited by Csk phosphorylation on tyrosine 505. Lck is also inhibited by SHP-1 dephosphorylation on tyrosine 394. Lck can also be inhibited by Cbl ubiquitin ligase, which is part of the ubiquitin-mediated pathway.

Saractinib, a specific inhibitor of LCK impairs maintenance of human T-ALL cells in vitro as well as in vivo by targeting this tyrosine kinase in cells displaying high level of lipid rafts.

Masitinib also inhibits Lck, which may have some impact on its therapeutic effects in canine mastocytoma.

HSP90 inhibitor NVP-BEP800 has been described to affect stability of the LCK kinase and growth of T-cell acute lymphoblastic leukemias.

Interactions 

Lck has been shown to interact with:

 ADAM15, 
 CD2, 
 CD44, 
 CD4, 
 COUP-TFII,
 DLG1, 
 NOTCH1,
 PIK3CA, 
 PTPN6, 
 PTPRC, 
 UNC119, 
 SYK, 
 UBE3A,  and
 ZAP70.

See also
 Tyrosine kinase
 T cell

References

Further reading

External links 
 
 

Enzymes
Tyrosine kinases
Immune system